Shaar Hashamayim (also Shaar Hashomayim,  "Gate of Heaven") may refer to:

Synagogues

Canada
 Congregation Shaar Hashomayim, Montreal
 Shaar Hashomayim Synagogue (Sudbury)

Egypt
 Sha'ar Hashamayim Synagogue (Cairo)

Gibraltar
 Great Synagogue (Gibraltar), known as Kahal Kadosh Sha'ar Hashamayim

Madeira
 Synagogue of Funchal, Funchal, Madeira, called Shaar Hashamayim

United Kingdom
 Bevis Marks Synagogue, London, also known as Kehal Shaar Hashamayim

United States
 Congregation Ahawath Chesed Shaar Hashomayim (Manhattan), also known as the Central Synagogue

Indonesia 

 Sha'ar Hashamayim Synagogue (Tondano)

Yeshivas
 Shaar Hashamayim Yeshiva, Jerusalem, a yeshiva specializing in the study of kabbalah

See also
 Shaarey Shomayim (disambiguation)